Su'  is a Mon–Khmer language of the Bahnaric branch spoken in Attapeu Province, Laos. The 1995 Attapeu census recorded a population of only 124 speakers in Sanamsay District. Su' autonyms are identical with that of the Jru' (known to the Lao as "Laven"), but they consider themselves to be a separate ethnic group (Sidwell 2003:19). There could also possibly be speakers in Stung Treng Province, Cambodia.

Su' speakers live in villages on both sides of Route 18, from Ban Chanto to about 10 km before Ban Mai.

References

Sidwell, Paul (2003). A Handbook of comparative Bahnaric, Vol. 1: West Bahnaric. Pacific Linguistics, 551. Canberra: Research School of Pacific and Asian Studies, Australian National University.

Bahnaric languages
Languages of Laos